Roberta Ann MacAvoy (born December 13, 1949) is an American fantasy and science fiction author. Several of her books draw on Celtic or Zen themes. She won the John W. Campbell Award for Best New Writer in 1984.

Biography
R. A. MacAvoy was born in Cleveland, Ohio. She attended Case Western Reserve University and received a B.A. in 1971. She worked from 1975 to 1978 as an assistant to the financial aid officer of Columbia College of Columbia University and from 1978 to 1982 as a computer programmer at SRI International before turning to full-time writing in 1982. She married Ronald Allen Cain in 1978.

R. A. MacAvoy was diagnosed with dystonia (a neuro-muscular disorder causing painful sustained muscle contractions) following the publication of her Lens of the World series in the early 1990s. She now has the disorder under control and has returned to writing.

Bibliography

The Black Dragon series
 Tea with the Black Dragon (1983)
 Twisting the Rope (1986)

The Damiano series
 Damiano (1983, Bantam)
 Damiano's Lute (1984, Bantam)
 Raphael (1984, Bantam)
 omnibus edition titled A Trio for Lute
These books were adapted by Bantam Software into a text adventure, I, Damiano: The Wizard of Partestrada, for MS-DOS and Apple IIe computers.

The Lens of the World series
 Lens of the World (1990)
 King of the Dead (1991)
 Winter of the Wolf [vt The Belly of the Wolf] (1993)

Ewen Young
 The Go-Between (2005) – Amazon Shorts e-book, republished with editorial changes as In Between (2009)
 Death and Resurrection (2011, Prime Books) – includes The Go-Between/In Between

Other novels
 The Book of Kells (1985)
 The Grey Horse (1987)
 The Third Eagle (1989)
 Albatross (with Nancy Palmer) (2016)
 Shimmer (with Nancy Palmer) (2018)

References

External links
 
 RAMacavoy.com – blog 
 Review of Damiano & Damiano's  Lute at Ansible.co.uk, by editor David Langford 

1949 births
20th-century American novelists
20th-century American women writers
21st-century American novelists
21st-century American women writers
American fantasy writers
American science fiction writers
American women novelists
John W. Campbell Award for Best New Writer winners
Living people
Women science fiction and fantasy writers